Gerardo Luis Fernández (born March 29, 1977) is a former  road racing cyclist from Argentina, who was a professional from 2003.

Major achievements 

2005
 1st, Trophée Joaquim Agostinho
2007
 1st, Stage 3, Tour de l'État de Sao Paulo
 1st, Stage 2, Volta Ciclistica Internacional do Paraná
 3rd  Argentine National Road Race Championships
2008
 1st  Argentine National Road Race Championships
 1st, Stage 2, Tour de Bolivie
 2nd, General Classification, Tour de San Luis
 1st, General Classification, Clásica del Oeste-Doble Bragado
2009
 1st, Stage 3, Giro del Sol San Juan

External links

Profile 

1977 births
Living people
Argentine male cyclists
Place of birth missing (living people)